Dudley Fitts (April 28, 1903 – July 10, 1968) was an American  teacher, critic, poet, and 
translator.  He was born in Boston, Massachusetts, and attended Harvard University, where he edited the Harvard Advocate. He taught at The Choate School 1926–1941 and at Phillips Academy at Andover 1941–1968. He and his former student at Choate, Robert Fitzgerald, published translations of Alcestis of Euripides (1936), Antigone of Sophocles (1939), Oedipus Rex (1949), and The Oedipus Cycle (1949). Their translations were praised for their clarity and poetic equality.

He died in Andover, Massachusetts.

Bibliography
•  Poems 1929-1936, Dudley Fitts-Publisher: New Directions, Norfolk, Conn. 1937
Aristophanes: Four Comedies - Publisher: Harcourt - Date: 1 January 2003 
Four Greek Plays: Agamemnon of Aeschylus/Oedipus Rex of Sophocles/Alcestis of Euripides/Birds of Aristophanes Editor: Dudley Fitts - Publisher: Harcourt - 2002 
From the Greek Anthology: Poems in English Paraphrase - Publisher: Faber and Faber, 1957.

References

External links
 
 Dudley Fitts Papers. Yale Collection of American Literature, Beinecke Rare Book and Manuscript Library.

American classical scholars
1903 births
1968 deaths
20th-century American poets
Translators of Ancient Greek texts
Harvard Advocate alumni
20th-century translators
Members of the American Academy of Arts and Letters